Jacopo Petriccione (born 22 February 1995) is an Italian football player who plays for  club Crotone.

Club career
He made his professional debut in the Lega Pro for Pistoiese on 13 September 2015 in a game against Siena.

On 18 January 2022, he joined Benevento in Serie B on loan.

References

External links
 

1995 births
People from Gorizia
Footballers from Friuli Venezia Giulia
Living people
Italian footballers
Italy youth international footballers
U.S. Pistoiese 1921 players
Ternana Calcio players
S.S.C. Bari players
U.S. Lecce players
F.C. Crotone players
Pordenone Calcio players
Benevento Calcio players
Serie A players
Serie B players
Serie C players
Association football midfielders